Out of My Tree is the first solo album by John Sykes, released in 1995. After Sykes' previous band Blue Murder was dropped by Geffen Records, he signed a new recording contract with the Japanese branch of Mercury Records. Viewing this as a fresh start, the band was renamed Sykes. Out of My Tree was recorded virtually live in the studio to preserve the arrangements in concert.

Track listing

All songs written and composed by John Sykes.

Personnel

Credits are adapted from the album's liner notes.

References

1995 debut albums
John Sykes albums
Albums produced by John Sykes